The 4th BET Awards took place at the Kodak Theatre in Los Angeles, California on June 29, 2004. The awards recognized Americans in music, acting, sports, and other fields of entertainment over the past year. Comedienne Mo'Nique hosted the event for the second time.

Performances
Kanye West (featuring Yolanda Adams) — "Jesus Walks"

Jay-Z (featuring Kid Rock, Dave Navarro, Sheila E., Rick Rubin, Questlove, Omar Edwards,  and Adam Blackstone) — "99 Problems" and "Public Service Announcement (Interlude)"

Awards and nominations
Video of the Year
 Outkast" for Hey Ya!"
 Beyoncé for "Crazy in Love" featuring Jay Z
 Alicia Keys for "You Don't Know My Name"
 Outkast for "The Way You Move" featuring Sleepy Brown
 Usher for "Yeah!" featuring Ludacris & Lil Jon

Viewer's Choice
 Usher for "Yeah!" featuring Ludacris & Lil Jon
 Outkast" for Hey Ya!"
 Kanye West for "All Falls Down" featuring Syleena Johnson
 Beyoncé for "Crazy in Love" featuring Jay Z
 Lil Jon and the East Side Boyz for "Get Low" featuring Ying Yang Twins

Best Collaboration
 Beyoncé for "Crazy in Love" featuring Jay Z
 Usher for "Yeah!" featuring Ludacris & Lil Jon
 Outkast for "The Way You Move" featuring Sleepy Brown
 Twista for "Slow Jamz" featuring Kanye West & Jamie Foxx
 Pharrell Williams for "Frontin'" featuring Jay Z

Best New Artist
 Kanye West
 Pharrell Williams
 Ruben Studdard
 Anthony Hamilton
 Chingy

Best Group
 Outkast
 G-Unit
 Lil Jon and the East Side Boyz
 Jagged Edge
 Floetry

Best Gospel Artist
 Yolanda Adams
 Vickie Winans
 Byron Cage
 Smokie Norful
 Donnie McClurkin

Best Female Hip-Hop Artist
 Missy Elliott
 Da Brat
 Jacki-O
 MC Lyte
 Rah Digga

Best Male Hip-Hop Artist
 Jay Z
 50 Cent
 Chingy
 Kanye West
 Ludacris

Best Female R&B Artist
 Beyoncé
 Mary J. Blige
 Janet Jackson
 Alicia Keys
 Monica

Best Male R&B Artist
 Usher
 Anthony Hamilton
 Ruben Studdard
 R. Kelly
 Luther Vandross

Best Actress
 Halle Berry
 Beyoncé
 Vivica A. Fox
 Sanaa Lathan
 Gabrielle Union

Best Actor
 Denzel Washington
 Morgan Freeman
 Mos Def
 Will Smith
 Don Cheadle
 Laurence Fishburne

Best Female Athlete of the Year
 Serena Williams
 Cheryl Ford
 Lisa Leslie
 Laila Ali
 Venus Williams

Best Male Athlete of the Year
 LeBron James
 Barry Bonds
 Carmelo Anthony
 Tiger Woods
 Shaquille O'Neal

Lifetime Achievement Award
 The Isley Brothers

Humanitarian Award
 Danny Glover

References

BET Awards